Rudolf "Rudi" Hiden (9 March 1909 – 11 September 1973) was an Austrian-French footballer who played as a goalkeeper for Grazer AK, Wiener AC and RC Paris. He was capped internationally by the Austria and France national teams. In later life, Hiden managed several clubs in Italy, including Palermo.

Playing career
Born in Austria and nicknamed Rudi, he was a successful Austrian international and in 1930 Herbert Chapman's Arsenal tried to sign him, but the Players Union and the Football League in England prevented him from doing so. He moved to France in 1933 to play for RC Paris alongside Auguste Jordan and later gained French nationality. Goalkeeper of the Austrian Wunderteam, he was also capped once for France. During the war, he served in the French military.

Honours
RC Paris
Division 1: 1935–36
Coupe de France: 1935–36, 1938–39, 1939–40

References

External links

1909 births
1973 deaths
Footballers from Graz
Austrian emigrants to France
Austrian footballers
Austrian expatriate footballers
Austria international footballers
French footballers
France international footballers
Dual internationalists (football)
Association football goalkeepers
Racing Club de France Football players
Ligue 1 players
Austrian football managers
French football managers 
Naturalized citizens of France 
French military personnel of World War II
Palermo F.C. managers
Expatriate footballers in France
Expatriate football managers in Italy
Austrian expatriate sportspeople in France
Austrian expatriate sportspeople in Italy